Mill Creek Township, Ohio may refer to several places:

Mill Creek Township, Coshocton County, Ohio
Mill Creek Township, Hamilton County, Ohio
Mill Creek Township, Williams County, Ohio

See also
Mill Creek (disambiguation)
Millcreek Township (disambiguation)

Ohio township disambiguation pages